James Glen (1701 – July 18, 1777) was a politician in the Province of South Carolina. He was appointed Royal Governor of South Carolina in 1738, but did not arrive in the province until December 17, 1743. He served as governor until June 1, 1756 and was succeeded by William Henry Lyttelton. On June 21, 1761, Glen returned to Europe and died in London. He is buried in St Michael's Parish Church, Linlithgow, Scotland.

Early life

He was born in Linlithgow in 1701 to Alexander Glen and his wife Marion Graham. The family was of relatively high social standing and he studied Law at Edinburgh University and Leyden University. He later rose to be Provost of Linlithgow from 1724 to 1726 and again 1730 to 1736, becoming official Keeper of Linlithgow Palace in 1743. He began travelling to America in 1739 but returned permanently to his home town from 1757, living at Cross House in Linlithgow.

Governorship 
James Glen has the longest term of governorship of any of those of colonial South Carolina.  His term was noted for extensive dealings with Native American tribes on the colony's western and southern borders.

Controversy over Salary 
Traditionally the governor of South Carolina played the role of defender of the southern frontier but with the creation of Georgia that role passed to the Georgian governor James Oglethorpe. This transfer of roles was accompanied by the transfer of a thousand pounds that no longer went to the governor of South Carolina but now went to his Georgian counterpart. James Glen stayed in England to protest this change and William Bull acted as governor in his stead.

Dealings with Native Americans
Governor Glen was noted for forging a 1755 treaty with the Cherokee, known as the Treaty of Saluda Old Town, in present-day Saluda County and the building of Fort Prince George near Keowee River. He was also responsible for promoting an official policy that aimed to create in Indians an "aversion" to African Americans in an attempt to thwart possible alliances between them.

King George's War 
During King George's War, Governor Glen sent a trade delegation led by notable Indian trader and historian James Adair to win over Red Shoes (Choctaw chief) to abandon their alliance with the French and to side with the British.  The efforts led to a great civil war amongst the Choctaw Nation.  Adair blames the resulting failure on Glen for not supporting this mission.

Family

His younger sister Elizabeth married James Gordon of Ellon and was known as Mrs Glen Gordon. It was she who entertained Bonnie Prince Charlie in 1746 in her capacity as Deputy Keeper of Linlithgow Palace.

See also
List of colonial governors of South Carolina

References

External links
The James Glen Papers

1701 births
1777 deaths
Colonial governors of South Carolina